Ole Theodor Jensen Mortensen, also known as Theodor Mortensen (22 February 1868 – 3 April 1952) was a Danish scientist and professor at the Zoological Museum, Copenhagen. He specialized in sea urchins (Echinoidea) and provided an enormous marine collection to the museum. He collected many sea urchin species on his expeditions between 1899–1930.

Mortensen is the author of A Monograph of the echinoidea and Report on the echinoidea collected by the United States fisheries steamer "Albatross" during the Philippine expedition, 1907–1910.

Frog Sylvirana mortenseni, also known as Mortensen's frog, is named in his honour.

References

External links 
 Mortensen, Dr Ole Theodor Jensen Nationaal Herbarium Nederland

Danish zoologists
1868 births
1952 deaths